Severo Matías Moto Nsá (born November 6, 1943), known as Severo Moto, is the most notable opposition politician in Equatorial Guinea, and leader of the Progress Party of Equatorial Guinea. He lives in Spain where he has established a government in exile, to the irritation of President Teodoro Obiang Nguema.

Born at Acock in Río Muni, Moto trained to become a Catholic priest. Under President Francisco Macías Nguema, he was a radio operator and newspaper editor during the 1970s, but he was eventually placed under house arrest and was not released until Obiang overthrew Macias in 1979. Obiang initially entrusted Moto with a series of important jobs: he represented Equatorial Guinea at the Non-Aligned Movement's summit in Havana in September 1979, he was appointed as Technical Director at the Ministry of Information and Tourism in 1980, and he was promoted to the post of Minister of Information and Tourism in 1981. However, Moto and President Obiang had a falling-out shortly thereafter, apparently due to disagreement over policy and Moto's preference for reforms to allow more openness; he fled Equatorial Guinea in December 1981 and settled in Spain, where he remained active as an opposition leader in exile.

Returning home as an opposition leader, Moto was imprisoned at Malabo's reviled Black Beach prison, but later released and allowed to go back into exile. He claims to have won several elections in Equatorial Guinea. He was reportedly on good terms with José María Aznar, who was Prime Minister of Spain from 1996 to 2004. Due to this and his position as the main contender to become president after a coup, he was accused by Equatorial Guinea of being the instigator of the March 2004 attempt led by Simon Mann and Nick du Toit, and tried in absentia. He disappeared for a short time in 2005, only to reappear unharmed. He claimed a pair of hitmen had taken him out on a yacht in Dubrovnik, Croatia, only to let him go because he was a fellow Roman Catholic.

In Spain
On December 30, 2005 the Spanish government lifted his political asylum. Moto stated that before being expelled to a third country he would return to Equatorial Guinea in order to call for free elections. He appealed the decision, and eventually, in March 2008, the Spanish Supreme Court upheld his asylum request.

Weapons were found in a car at the port in Sagunto on March 4, 2008 and they were reportedly about to be sent to Equatorial Guinea. Moto was arrested in Toledo Province in mid-April 2008 on suspicion of involvement in this.

References

External links

 

1943 births
Living people
People from Centro Sur
Equatoguinean Roman Catholics
Progress Party of Equatorial Guinea politicians
Equatoguinean exiles
Equatoguinean prisoners and detainees
Prisoners and detainees of Equatorial Guinea
Equatoguinean religious leaders
20th-century Roman Catholic priests
21st-century Roman Catholic priests